Callilepis is a genus of ground spiders first described by Niklas Westring in 1874. Some are found from Mexico to Canada, others from Europe to India. They are most commonly found in dry areas, sandy roads and beaches.

Description
Individuals of this genus is easily distinguished from other Gnaphosidae by the single translucent lamina on the cheliceral retromargin, the short, angular endites and the flattened, transverse posterior median eyes. These eyes are probably not functional due to a series of ridges. Species range in size from 2.5 to 7 mm. The lateral eyes are larger than the medians. The abdomen is dark gray, longer than wide, with a dark, shiny anterior scutum in males, sometimes with white spots.

Systematics
The species belong to two groups. The nocturna group consists of C. nocturna, C. pluto, C. imbecilla, C. chisos and C. concolor; the schuszteri group of C. schuszteri, C. mumai, C. eremella, C. gertschi and C. gosoga. Although both groups occur on both sides of the Atlantic, no species is holarctic in distribution.

Species
 it contains eighteen species:
Callilepis chakanensis Tikader, 1982 — India
Callilepis chisos Platnick, 1975 — USA
Callilepis concolor Simon, 1914 — Southern Europe
Callilepis cretica (Roewer, 1928) — Macedonia, Greece, Turkey, Azerbaijan
Callilepis eremella Chamberlin, 1928 — North America
Callilepis gertschi Platnick, 1975 — USA, Mexico
Callilepis gosoga Chamberlin & Gertsch, 1940 — USA
Callilepis imbecilla (Keyserling, 1887) — USA, Canada
Callilepis ketani Gajbe, 1984 — India
Callilepis lambai Tikader & Gajbe, 1977 — India
Callilepis mumai Platnick, 1975 — USA, Mexico
Callilepis nocturna (Linnaeus, 1758) — Europe, Caucasus, Russia (Europe to Far East), Kazakhstan, China, Japan
Callilepis pawani Gajbe, 1984 — India
Callilepis pluto Banks, 1896 — USA, Canada
Callilepis rajani Gajbe, 1984 — India
Callilepis rajasthanica Tikader & Gajbe, 1977 — India
Callilepis rukminiae Tikader & Gajbe, 1977 — India
Callilepis schuszteri (Herman, 1879) — Europe, Caucasus, Russia (Europe to Far East), China, Korea, Japan

References

Gnaphosidae
Araneomorphae genera
Cosmopolitan spiders